Volnoye is the name of several rural localities in Russia:
Volnoye, Arkharinsky District, Amur Oblast, a selo in Arkharinsky District, Amur Oblast
Volnoye, Astrakhan Oblast, a selo in Kharabalinsky District, Astrakhan Oblast